Péter Takács (born 25 January 1990 in Miskolc) is a Hungarian football player who currently plays for Dorogi FC.

Club statistics

Updated to games played as of 1 June 2014.

Honours
 FIFA U-20 World Cup:
 Third place: 2009

References

External links
 Profile
 

1990 births
Living people
Sportspeople from Miskolc
Hungarian footballers
Hungary youth international footballers
Hungary under-21 international footballers
Association football midfielders
Diósgyőri VTK players
Lombard-Pápa TFC footballers
Mezőkövesdi SE footballers
Békéscsaba 1912 Előre footballers
Ceglédi VSE footballers
Kazincbarcikai SC footballers
Dorogi FC footballers
Nemzeti Bajnokság I players
Nemzeti Bajnokság II players